Oxalidales is an order of flowering plants, included within the rosid subgroup of eudicots. Compound leaves are common in Oxalidales and the majority of the species in this order have five or six sepals and petals.

The anthophytes are a grouping of plant taxa bearing flower-like reproductive structures. They were formerly thought to be a clade comprising plants bearing flower-like structures.  The group contained the angiosperms - the extant flowering plants, such as roses and grasses - as well as the Gnetales and the extinct Bennettitales.

23,420 species of vascular plant have been recorded in South Africa, making it the sixth most species-rich country in the world and the most species-rich country on the African continent. Of these, 153 species are considered to be threatened. Nine biomes have been described in South Africa: Fynbos, Succulent Karoo, desert, Nama Karoo, grassland, savanna, Albany thickets, the Indian Ocean coastal belt, and forests.

The 2018 South African National Biodiversity Institute's National Biodiversity Assessment plant checklist lists 35,130 taxa in the phyla Anthocerotophyta (hornworts (6)), Anthophyta (flowering plants (33534)), Bryophyta (mosses (685)), Cycadophyta (cycads (42)), Lycopodiophyta (Lycophytes(45)), Marchantiophyta (liverworts (376)), Pinophyta (conifers (33)), and Pteridophyta (cryptogams (408)).

Four families are represented in the literature. Listed taxa include species, subspecies, varieties, and forms as recorded, some of which have subsequently been allocated to other taxa as synonyms, in which cases the accepted taxon is appended to the listing. Multiple entries under alternative names reflect taxonomic revision over time.

Connaraceae
Family: Connaraceae,

Cnestis
Genus Cnestis:
 Cnestis polyphylla Lam. indigenous

Cunoniaceae
Family: Cunoniaceae,

Cunonia
Genus Cunonia:
 Cunonia capensis L. endemic

Platylophus
Genus Platylophus:
 Platylophus trifoliatus (L.f.) D.Don, endemic

Elaeocarpaceae
Family: Elaeocarpaceae

Elaeocarpus
Genus Elaeocarpus
 Elaeocarpus reticulatus Sm. not indigenous, cultivated, naturalised

Oxalidaceae
Family: Oxalidaceae,

Oxalis
Genus Oxalis:
 Oxalis adenodes Sond. indigenous
 Oxalis adspersa Eckl. & Zeyh. endemic
 Oxalis albiuscula T.M.Salter, endemic
 Oxalis algoensis Eckl. & Zeyh. endemic
 Oxalis ambigua Jacq. endemic
 Oxalis amblyodonta T.M.Salter, endemic
 Oxalis amblyosepala Schltr. endemic
 Oxalis annae F.Bolus, endemic
 Oxalis anomala T.M.Salter, endemic
 Oxalis argillacea F.Bolus, endemic
 Oxalis argyrophylla T.M.Salter, endemic
 Oxalis aridicola T.M.Salter, endemic
 Oxalis attaquana T.M.Salter, indigenous
 Oxalis aurea Schltr. endemic
 Oxalis ausensis R.Knuth, indigenous
 Oxalis beneprotecta Dinter ex R.Knuth, indigenous
 Oxalis bifida Thunb. endemic
 Oxalis bifurca Lodd. indigenous
 Oxalis bifurca Lodd. var. angustiloba Sond. endemic
 Oxalis bifurca Lodd. var. bifurca ,endemic
 Oxalis blastorrhiza T.M.Salter, endemic
 Oxalis bowiei Lindl. endemic
 Oxalis burkei Sond. endemic
 Oxalis burtoniae T.M.Salter, endemic
 Oxalis callimarginata Weintroub, accepted as Oxalis goniorrhiza Eckl. & Zeyh. present
 Oxalis callosa R.Knuth, endemic
 Oxalis callosa R.Knuth var. callosa ,endemic
 Oxalis callosa R.Knuth var. minor T.M.Salter, endemic
 Oxalis calvinensis R.Knuth, endemic
 Oxalis camelopardalis T.M.Salter, endemic
 Oxalis campicola T.M.Salter, endemic
 Oxalis campylorrhiza T.M.Salter, endemic
 Oxalis capillacea E.Mey. ex Sond. endemic
 Oxalis caprina Thunb. endemic
 Oxalis cathara T.M.Salter, endemic
 Oxalis ciliaris Jacq. indigenous
 Oxalis ciliaris Jacq. var. ciliaris ,endemic
 Oxalis ciliaris Jacq. var. pageae (L.Bolus) T.M.Salter, endemic
 Oxalis clavifolia Sond. endemic
 Oxalis commutata Sond. indigenous
 Oxalis commutata Sond. var. commutata ,endemic
 Oxalis commutata Sond. var. concolor T.M.Salter, endemic
 Oxalis commutata Sond. var. montana T.M.Salter, endemic
 Oxalis comosa E.Mey. ex Sond. endemic
 Oxalis compressa L.f. indigenous
 Oxalis compressa L.f. var. compressa ,endemic
 Oxalis compressa L.f. var. purpurascens T.M.Salter, endemic
 Oxalis comptonii T.M.Salter, endemic
 Oxalis confertifolia (Kuntze) R.Knuth, accepted as Oxalis confertifolia (Kuntze) R.Knuth var. confertifolia ,endemic
 Oxalis convexula Jacq. endemic
 Oxalis copiosa F.Bolus, indigenous
 Oxalis corniculata L. not indigenous, naturalised, invasive
 Oxalis creaseyi T.M.Salter, endemic
 Oxalis crispula Sond. endemic
 Oxalis crocea T.M.Salter, indigenous
 Oxalis cuneata Jacq. endemic
 Oxalis davyana R.Knuth, endemic
 Oxalis densa N.E.Br. endemic
 Oxalis dentata Jacq. accepted as Oxalis livida Jacq. var. altior T.M.Salter, present
 Oxalis depressa Eckl. & Zeyh. indigenous
 Oxalis deserticola T.M.Salter, endemic
 Oxalis dichotoma T.M.Salter, endemic
 Oxalis dilatata L.Bolus, endemic
 Oxalis dines Ornduff, endemic
 Oxalis disticha Jacq. endemic
 Oxalis dregei Sond. endemic
 Oxalis droseroides E.Mey. ex Sond. endemic
 Oxalis duriuscula Schltr. endemic
 Oxalis ebracteata Savign. endemic
 Oxalis eckloniana C.Presl, indigenous
 Oxalis eckloniana C.Presl var. eckloniana ,endemic
 Oxalis eckloniana C.Presl var. hopefieldiana R.Knuth, endemic
 Oxalis eckloniana C.Presl var. montigena (Schltr.) R.Knuth, endemic
 Oxalis eckloniana C.Presl var. robusta T.M.Salter, endemic
 Oxalis eckloniana C.Presl var. sonderi T.M.Salter, endemic
 Oxalis engleriana Schltr. endemic
 Oxalis ericifolia Oberl. & Dreyer, endemic
 Oxalis exserta T.M.Salter, indigenous
 Oxalis extensa T.M.Salter, indigenous
 Oxalis fabifolia Jacq. accepted as Oxalis flava L. var. fabifolia (Jacq.) Dreyer & Oberl. endemic
 Oxalis falcatula T.M.Salter, endemic
 Oxalis fergusonae T.M.Salter, endemic
 Oxalis fibrosa F.Bolus, endemic
 Oxalis flava L. endemic
 Oxalis flava L. var. fabifolia (Jacq.) Dreyer & Oberl. endemic
 Oxalis flava L. var. flava ,endemic
 Oxalis flava L. var. unifoliolata Dreyer & Oberl. endemic
 Oxalis flaviuscula T.M.Salter, endemic
 Oxalis flaviuscula T.M.Salter var. flaviuscula ,endemic
 Oxalis flaviuscula T.M.Salter var. longifolia T.M.Salter, endemic
 Oxalis fourcadei T.M.Salter, endemic
 Oxalis foveolata Turcz. endemic
 Oxalis fragilis T.M.Salter, endemic
 Oxalis fragilis T.M.Salter var. fragilis ,endemic
 Oxalis fragilis T.M.Salter var. pellucida T.M.Salter, endemic
 Oxalis furcillata T.M.Salter, indigenous
 Oxalis furcillata T.M.Salter var. caulescens T.M.Salter, endemic
 Oxalis furcillata T.M.Salter var. furcillata ,endemic
 Oxalis giftbergensis T.M.Salter, endemic
 Oxalis glabra Thunb. endemic
 Oxalis goniorrhiza Eckl. & Zeyh. endemic
 Oxalis gracilipes Schltr. endemic
 Oxalis gracilis Jacq. indigenous
 Oxalis gracilis Jacq. var. gracilis ,endemic
 Oxalis gracilis Jacq. var. lilacea T.M.Salter, endemic
 Oxalis gracilis Jacq. var. purpurea T.M.Salter, endemic
 Oxalis grammopetala Sond. endemic
 Oxalis grammophylla T.M.Salter, endemic
 Oxalis haedulipes T.M.Salter, indigenous
 Oxalis heidelbergensis T.M.Salter, endemic
 Oxalis helicoides T.M.Salter, indigenous
 Oxalis helicoides T.M.Salter var. alba T.M.Salter, endemic
 Oxalis helicoides T.M.Salter var. helicoides ,endemic
 Oxalis heterophylla DC. endemic
 Oxalis hirsuta Sond. endemic
 Oxalis hirta L. indigenous
 Oxalis hirta L. var. canescens R.Knuth, endemic
 Oxalis hirta L. var. hirta ,endemic
 Oxalis hirta L. var. intermedia T.M.Salter, endemic
 Oxalis hirta L. var. polioeides T.M.Salter, endemic
 Oxalis hirta L. var. secunda (Jacq.) T.M.Salter, endemic
 Oxalis hirta L. var. tenuicaulis R.Knuth, endemic
 Oxalis hirta L. var. tubiflora (Jacq.) T.M.Salter, endemic
 Oxalis hygrophila Dreyer, endemic
 Oxalis imbricata Eckl. & Zeyh. indigenous
 Oxalis imbricata Eckl. & Zeyh. var. cuneifolia T.M.Salter, endemic
 Oxalis imbricata Eckl. & Zeyh. var. imbricata ,endemic
 Oxalis imbricata Eckl. & Zeyh. var. violacea R.Knuth, endemic
 Oxalis inaequalis Weintroub, endemic
 Oxalis incarnata L. endemic
 Oxalis inconspicua T.M.Salter, endemic
 Oxalis involuta T.M.Salter, endemic
 Oxalis ioeides T.M.Salter & Exell, endemic
 Oxalis kamiesbergensis T.M.Salter, endemic
 Oxalis knuthiana T.M.Salter, indigenous
 Oxalis lanata L.f., indigenous
 Oxalis lanata L.f. var. lanata ,endemic
 Oxalis lanata L.f. var. rosea T.M.Salter, endemic
 Oxalis lasiorrhiza T.M.Salter, endemic
 Oxalis lateriflora Jacq. accepted as Oxalis livida Jacq. var. altior T.M.Salter, present
 Oxalis latifolia Kunth, not indigenous; nat; inv
 Oxalis lawsonii F.Bolus, indigenous
 Oxalis laxicaulis R.Knuth, indigenous
 Oxalis leipoldtii Schltr. endemic
 Oxalis leptocalyx Sond. endemic
 Oxalis leptogramma T.M.Salter, endemic
 Oxalis levis T.M.Salter, endemic
 Oxalis lichenoides T.M.Salter, endemic
 Oxalis lindaviana Schltr. endemic
 Oxalis linearis Jacq. endemic
 Oxalis lineolata T.M.Salter, endemic
 Oxalis livida Jacq. indigenous
 Oxalis livida Jacq. var. altior T.M.Salter, endemic
 Oxalis livida Jacq. var. livida ,endemic
 Oxalis louisae T.M.Salter, endemic
 Oxalis luteola Jacq. endemic
 Oxalis macra Schltr. endemic
 Oxalis marlothii Schltr. ex R.Knuth, endemic
 Oxalis massoniana T.M.Salter, indigenous
 Oxalis massoniana T.M.Salter var. flavescens T.M.Salter, endemic
 Oxalis massoniana T.M.Salter var. massoniana ,endemic
 Oxalis meisneri Sond. endemic
 Oxalis melanograpta T.M.Salter, endemic
 Oxalis melanosticta Sond. indigenous
 Oxalis melanosticta Sond. var. latifolia T.M.Salter, endemic
 Oxalis melanosticta Sond. var. melanosticta ,endemic
 Oxalis microdonta T.M.Salter, endemic
 Oxalis minuta Thunb. endemic
 Oxalis monophylla L. indigenous
 Oxalis monophylla L. var. minor T.M.Salter, endemic
 Oxalis monophylla L. var. monophylla ,endemic
 Oxalis monophylla L. var. rotundifolia T.M.Salter, endemic
 Oxalis monophylla L. var. stenophylla (Meisn.) Sond. endemic
 Oxalis multicaulis Eckl. & Zeyh. endemic
 Oxalis multicaulis Eckl. & Zeyh. var. multicaulis ,endemic
 Oxalis multicaulis Eckl. & Zeyh. var. stolonifera T.M.Salter, endemic
 Oxalis namaquana Sond. indigenous
 Oxalis natans Thunb. [1], endemic
 Oxalis nidulans Eckl. & Zeyh. [1], indigenous
 Oxalis nidulans Eckl. & Zeyh. var. denticulata (Wolley-Dod) T.M.Salter, endemic
 Oxalis nidulans Eckl. & Zeyh. var. nidulans ,endemic
 Oxalis nivea Roets, Dreyer & Oberl. endemic
 Oxalis nortieri T.M.Salter, endemic
 Oxalis obliquifolia Steud. ex A.Rich. indigenous
 Oxalis obtusa Jacq. indigenous
 Oxalis oculifera E.G.H.Oliv. endemic
 Oxalis odorata J.C.Manning & Goldblatt, endemic
 Oxalis oligophylla T.M.Salter, endemic
 Oxalis orbicularis T.M.Salter, endemic
 Oxalis oreithala T.M.Salter, endemic
 Oxalis oreophila T.M.Salter, endemic
 Oxalis orthopoda T.M.Salter, endemic
 Oxalis pallens Eckl. & Zeyh. endemic
 Oxalis palmifrons T.M.Salter, endemic
 Oxalis pardalis Sond. endemic
 Oxalis pendulifolia T.M.Salter, endemic
 Oxalis perineson T.M.Salter & Exell, endemic
 Oxalis pes-caprae L. indigenous
 Oxalis pes-caprae L. var. pes-caprae, indigenous
 Oxalis pes-caprae L. var. sericea (L.f.) T.M.Salter, indigenous
 Oxalis petiolulata F.Bolus, endemic
 Oxalis petraea T.M.Salter, endemic
 Oxalis petricola Dreyer, Roets & Oberl. endemic
 Oxalis phloxidiflora Schltr. endemic
 Oxalis pillansiana T.M.Salter & Exell, endemic
 Oxalis pocockiae L.Bolus, endemic
 Oxalis polyphylla Jacq. indigenous
 Oxalis polyphylla Jacq. var. alba T.M.Salter, endemic
 Oxalis polyphylla Jacq. var. heptaphylla T.M.Salter, endemic
 Oxalis polyphylla Jacq. var. minor T.M.Salter, endemic
 Oxalis polyphylla Jacq. var. pentaphylla (Sims) T.M.Salter, endemic
 Oxalis polyphylla Jacq. var. polyphylla ,endemic
 Oxalis polyphylla Jacq. var. pubescens Sond. endemic
 Oxalis porphyriosiphon T.M.Salter, endemic
 Oxalis primuloides R.Knuth, endemic
 Oxalis psammophila G.Will. endemic
 Oxalis pseudohirta T.M.Salter, endemic
 Oxalis psilopoda Turcz. endemic
 Oxalis pulchella Jacq. indigenous
 Oxalis pulchella Jacq. var. glauca T.M.Salter, endemic
 Oxalis pulchella Jacq. var. leucotricha (Turcz.) T.M.Salter, endemic
 Oxalis pulchella Jacq. var. pulchella ,indigenous
 Oxalis pulchella Jacq. var. tomentosa Sond. indigenous
 Oxalis pulvinata Sond. endemic
 Oxalis punctata Thunb. endemic
 Oxalis purpurata Jacq. endemic
 Oxalis purpurea L. [1], indigenous
 Oxalis pusilla Jacq. [1], endemic
 Oxalis reclinata Jacq. indigenous
 Oxalis reclinata Jacq. var. micromera (Sond.) T.M.Salter, endemic
 Oxalis reclinata Jacq. var. quinata T.M.Salter, endemic
 Oxalis reclinata Jacq. var. reclinata ,endemic
 Oxalis recticaulis Sond. endemic
 Oxalis reflexa T.M.Salter, endemic
 Oxalis rhomboidea T.M.Salter, endemic
 Oxalis robinsonii T.M.Salter & Exell, endemic
 Oxalis rosettifolia Dreyer, Roets & Oberl. endemic
 Oxalis rubricallosa Dreyer, Roets & Oberl. endemic
 Oxalis rubro-punctata T.M.Salter, endemic
 Oxalis salteri L.Bolus, endemic
 Oxalis saltusbelli Dreyer & Roets, indigenous
 Oxalis semiloba Sond. indigenous
 Oxalis semiloba Sond. subsp. semiloba ,indigenous
 Oxalis senecta T.M.Salter, endemic
 Oxalis setosa E.Mey. ex Sond. indigenous
 Oxalis simplex T.M.Salter, endemic
 Oxalis smithiana Eckl. & Zeyh. indigenous
 Oxalis sonderiana (Kuntze) T.M.Salter, endemic
 Oxalis sororia Schltr. ex R.Knuth, accepted as Oxalis recticaulis Sond. 
 Oxalis stellata Eckl. & Zeyh. indigenous
 Oxalis stellata Eckl. & Zeyh. var. glandulosa T.M.Salter, endemic
 Oxalis stellata Eckl. & Zeyh. var. gracilior T.M.Salter, endemic
 Oxalis stellata Eckl. & Zeyh. var. montaguensis T.M.Salter, endemic
 Oxalis stellata Eckl. & Zeyh. var. stellata ,endemic
 Oxalis stenopetala T.M.Salter, endemic
 Oxalis stenoptera Turcz. indigenous
 Oxalis stenoptera Turcz. var. alba T.M.Salter, endemic
 Oxalis stenoptera Turcz. var. stenoptera ,endemic
 Oxalis stenoptera Turcz. var. undulata ,endemic
 Oxalis stenorrhyncha T.M.Salter, endemic
 Oxalis stictocheila T.M.Salter, endemic
 Oxalis stokoei Weintroub, endemic
 Oxalis strigosa T.M.Salter, endemic
 Oxalis suavis R.Knuth, endemic
 Oxalis subsessilis L.Bolus, endemic
 Oxalis suteroides T.M.Salter, indigenous
 Oxalis tenella Jacq. [2], endemic
 Oxalis tenuifolia Jacq. endemic
 Oxalis tenuipes T.M.Salter, indigenous
 Oxalis tenuipes T.M.Salter var. biapiculata T.M.Salter, endemic
 Oxalis tenuipes T.M.Salter var. tenuipes ,endemic
 Oxalis tenuis T.M.Salter, endemic
 Oxalis tomentosa Thunb. [1], endemic
 Oxalis tragopoda T.M.Salter, indigenous
 Oxalis truncatula Jacq. endemic
 Oxalis tysonii E.Phillips, endemic
 Oxalis uliginosa Schltr. endemic
 Oxalis urbaniana Schltr. accepted as Oxalis goniorrhiza Eckl. & Zeyh. present
 Oxalis variifolia Steud. endemic
 Oxalis versicolor L. indigenous
 Oxalis versicolor L. var. flaviflora Sond. endemic
 Oxalis versicolor L. var. latifolia Wolley-Dod, endemic
 Oxalis versicolor L. var. versicolor ,endemic
 Oxalis virginea Jacq. endemic
 Oxalis viscidula Schltr. endemic
 Oxalis viscosa E.Mey. ex Sond. endemic
 Oxalis xantha T.M.Salter, endemic
 Oxalis zeekoevleyensis R.Knuth, endemic
 Oxalis zeyheri Sond. endemic

References

South African plant biodiversity lists
Oxalidales